Acheilognathus macromandibularis is a species of freshwater ray-finned fish in the genus Acheilognathus.  It is endemic to China.  It grows to a maximum length of 5.2 cm.

References

Acheilognathus
Fish described in 1999
Freshwater fish of China
Endemic fauna of China
Taxobox binomials not recognized by IUCN